KVFS-LP is a low-powered radio station in Spokane, Washington.

Originally launched as KYRS-LP, the station was the fourth community radio barnraising of the Prometheus Radio Project, with original owner Thin Air Community Radio. Thin Air Community Radio sold KYRS-LP to new owners as a condition of being issued a license for full-power station KYRS.

External links
 

VFS-LP
VFS-LP